Almost Happy is the fourth studio album by Belgian rock band K's Choice.

Music
Almost Happy was recorded at Real World Studio's, Box, Wiltshire (UK) and published in 2000. Singles were "Almost Happy", "Busy" and "Another Year". The lyrics of this album are more autobiographical than of the previous album (Cocoon Crash). The music is, when compared to earlier work, more melancholy and intimate. The American (2002) version included an additional live CD and was published with another cover, featuring a drawing by band member Gert Bettens, who had also drawn the album covers for the two previous albums.

Track listing

Personnel 
Musicians:
 Sam Bettens - vocals, guitar
 Gert Bettens - guitar, vocals
 Koen Lieckens - drums
 Jan van Sichem Jr. - guitar
 Eric Grossman - bass

Guest musicians:
 Marshall Bird - keyboards

Mixed by Tchad Blake

Cover picture by Lieve Blanquaert

Charts

Weekly charts

Year-end charts

Certifications

References 

2000 albums
K's Choice albums
Sony Music Belgium albums